Robert Edward Peter Gascoyne-Cecil, 6th Marquess of Salisbury,  (24 October 1916 – 11 July 2003), styled Viscount Cranborne from 1947 to 1972, was a British landowner and Conservative politician.

Early life

Salisbury was the eldest and only surviving son of Robert Gascoyne-Cecil, 5th Marquess of Salisbury, by Elizabeth Vere Cavendish, daughter of Lord Richard Cavendish. During the Second World War he served in the Grenadier Guards. He took part in the invasion of Normandy in 1944 with the 2nd Battalion and was a member of the first British unit to enter Brussels. He was later appointed Military Assistant to Harold Macmillan, then the Resident Minister in North Africa.

He later sat as Conservative Member of Parliament for Bournemouth West from 1950 to 1954. In 1972 he succeeded his father in the marquessate and entered the House of Lords. He also succeeded his father as President of the Conservative Monday Club. He supported The Salisbury Review and was also president of the Anglo-Rhodesian Society and Friends of the Union.

Property

Lord Salisbury ran holdings of 8,500 acres around Hatfield House, and 1,300 acres at Cranborne Manor, Dorset. At the time of his obituary he owned property around Leicester and Leicester Square, London, held by Gascoyne Holdings.

Marriage and children
Lord Salisbury married Marjorie "Mollie" Olein Wyndham-Quin (15 July 1922 – 12 December 2016), granddaughter of Windham Wyndham-Quin, 5th Earl of Dunraven and Mount-Earl, on 18 December 1945. Lady Salisbury was a noted gardener.

They had seven children:

Robert Michael James Gascoyne-Cecil, 7th Marquess of Salisbury (b. 30 September 1946)
Lord Richard Valentine Gascoyne-Cecil (26 January 1948 – 20 April 1978)
Lord Charles Edward Vere Gascoyne-Cecil (b. 13 July 1949)
Lord Valentine William Gascoyne-Cecil (b. 13 May 1952)
Hon. Henry Gascoyne-Cecil (3 May 1955 – 6 May 1955)
Lady Rose Alice Elizabeth Cecil (b. 11 September 1956)
Lord Michael Hugh Cecil (b. 23 March 1960)

References

 Copping, Robert, The Monday Club – Crisis and After May 1975, pps: 15 & 25, published by the Current Affairs Information Service, Ilford, Essex, (P/B).

External links 
 

Robert
Gascoyne-Cecil, Robert
1916 births
2003 deaths
Gascoyne-Cecil, Robert
Gascoyne-Cecil, Robert
Salisbury, M6
Robert, Salisbury 6
British Army personnel of World War II
Deputy Lieutenants of Dorset
Grenadier Guards officers
20th-century English nobility

Salisbury 6th